Remy's pygmy shrew (Suncus remyi) is a species of mammal in the family Soricidae. It is found in Cameroon, the Central African Republic, the Republic of the Congo, and Gabon. Its natural habitat is subtropical or tropical moist lowland forests.

References

Remy's pygmy shrew
Mammals of the Central African Republic
Mammals of Cameroon
Mammals of Gabon
Mammals of the Republic of the Congo
Taxonomy articles created by Polbot
Remy's pygmy shrew